Jonathan Kirsch is an American attorney, writer, and a columnist for the Los Angeles Times. He is a bestselling author of books on religion, the Bible, and Judaism.

Biography

Life
Kirsch earned a B.A. degree in Russian and Jewish history from the University of California, Santa Cruz and a J.D. degree from Loyola University School of Law. He serves as adjunct Professor on the Faculty of New York University’s Professional Publishing Institute and has contributed to Newsweek, The New Republic, Los Angeles magazine, and Publishers Weekly among other publications. He is also the author of ten books, and a critic.

His son, Adam Kirsch, is an American poet and literary critic.

Books
 Bad Moon Rising (1977)
 Lovers in a Winter Circle (1978)
 Harlot by the Side of the Road: Forbidden Tales of the Bible. Ballantine Books (1998)
 Moses: A Life. Ballantine Books; New Ed edition (1999)
 King David: The Real Life of the Man who Ruled Israel. Ballantine Books (2001)
 The Woman who Laughed at God: The Untold History of the Jewish People. Penguin Reprint edition (2002)
 God Against the Gods: The History of the War Between Monotheism and Polytheism. Viking Adult (2004) 
 A History of the End of the World: How the Most Controversial Book in the Bible Changed the Course of Western Civilization. HarperOne (2006).
 The Grand Inquisitor's Manual: A History of Terror in the Name of God HarperOne (2008).
 The Short, Strange Life of Herschel Grynszpan: A Boy Avenger, a Nazi Diplomat, and a Murder in Paris Liveright (2013).

References

External links

Author page on Jewish Journal

Year of birth missing (living people)
Living people
20th-century American novelists
20th-century American biographers
American columnists
21st-century American historians
21st-century American male writers
American lawyers
American literary critics
American male novelists
Historians of Jews and Judaism
Loyola Marymount University alumni
University of California, Santa Cruz alumni
20th-century American male writers
American male biographers
American male non-fiction writers